Pongalur is a small town located in Palladam Taluk of Tiruppur district in Tamil Nadu, India. It is located along the Coimbatore - Trichy National highway and headquarters the Pongalur block. It is located 10 km from Palladam, 22 km from Kangeyam, 35 km from Dharapuram and 20 km from district headquarter Tiruppur and 50 km from Coimbatore. It is known for its famous Varadharaja perumal Temple.

Administration and politics 
Pongalur was a part of Coimbatore district and now Tiruppur district. Kundadam comes under Palladam taluk, Tiruppur district and headquarters of Pongalur block. It falls underPongalur Assembly constituency and Tiruppur Lok Sabha constituency.

AIADMK, DMK and BJP are the major political parties in this area. This town also houses a police station.

See also 

 Avinashi
 Dharapuram
 Palladam
 Uthiyur

References 

Cities and towns in Tiruppur district